The Bulgarian National Time Trial Championships are held annually to decide the cycling champions in the time trial discipline, across various categories. The championship was first held in 2000.

Men

See also
Bulgarian National Road Race Championships
National road cycling championships

Notes

References

National road cycling championships
Cycle races in Bulgaria
Recurring sporting events established in 2000